Stade Numa-Daly Magenta is a multi-use stadium in Nouméa, New Caledonia.  It is currently used mostly for football matches.  The stadium holds 10,000. It is currently the home ground of the New Caledonia national football team and was one of the host venues at the 2011 Pacific Games for the men's football tournament.

References 

Football venues in New Caledonia
Buildings and structures in Nouméa
New Caledonia
Sport in Nouméa